2E or II-E may refer to:
2nd meridian east, a longitude coordinate
 Apple IIe, a 1983 model in the Apple II series of personal computers
 Aptera 2e, the 2009 and first model in the Aptera 2 Series by Aptera Motors
 Oflag II-E, a prisoner of war camp in Germany
 2nd arrondissement of Paris
 Transcription Factor II E
 Twice exceptional, an individual with special needs who is also gifted.
 A reference to data collected by the Einstein Observatory (version 2)
 YoRHa No. 2 Type E, the actual designation of YoRHa No. 2 Type B in Nier: Automata
 Advanced Dungeons & Dragons 2nd Edition, a version of the Dungeons & Dragons role-playing game that debuted in 1989.

See also
E2 (disambiguation)
IIE (disambiguation)